Silver Naara Louise Siegers (born 14 February 2000) is a Dutch cricketer. In July 2018, she was named in the Netherlands' squad for the 2018 ICC Women's World Twenty20 Qualifier tournament. She made her Women's Twenty20 International (WT20I) for the Netherlands against Bangladesh in the World Twenty20 Qualifier on 8 July 2018.

In May 2019, she was named in Netherlands' squad for the 2019 ICC Women's Qualifier Europe tournament in Spain. In August 2019, she was named in the Dutch squad for the 2019 ICC Women's World Twenty20 Qualifier tournament in Scotland. In October 2021, she was named in the Dutch team for the 2021 Women's Cricket World Cup Qualifier tournament in Zimbabwe.

Having an elder sister Heather Siegers already playing cricket, Silver was inspired to do well and compete at the highest level with her sister, right since she was in school.

References

External links
 

2000 births
Living people
Dutch women cricketers
Netherlands women One Day International cricketers
Netherlands women Twenty20 International cricketers
Sportspeople from Haarlem
21st-century Dutch women